William Bevan (May 16, 1922 – February 19, 2007) was an American psychologist and a past president of the American Psychological Association (APA). He founded the Talent Identification Program at Duke University.

Biography
After graduating from Franklin and Marshall College, Bevan served in the navy. He completed graduate work at Duke University. Bevan was a Fulbright Scholar in Norway, served as provost and vice president at Johns Hopkins University, and was the executive officer of the American Association for the Advancement of Science. He came back to Duke as the psychology department chair, served as provost and founded the Talent Identification Program. He was the 1982 APA president. William was a distinguished member of PSI CHI International Honor Society for Psychology.

Bevan died in 2007, nearly 20 years after suffering a serious stroke. The American Psychological Foundation sponsors the William Bevan Lecture on Psychology and Public Policy.

References

1922 births
2007 deaths
Franklin & Marshall College
Duke University alumni
Duke University faculty
Johns Hopkins University faculty
Presidents of the American Psychological Association
20th-century American psychologists
United States Navy personnel of World War II
Members of the National Academy of Medicine